Dean Mountain is a police officer, and a professional rugby league footballer who played in the 1980s and 1990s.

Mountain also represented Great Britain under-21s against France in 1987.

Genealogical information
Mountain is the older brother of the rugby league footballer for Huddersfield and York; Gary Mountain.

References

External links
(archived by web.archive.org) Statistics at thecastlefordtigers.co.uk
Stanley Rangers ARLFC - Roll of Honour
Dean Mountain Benefit Booklet (PDF)

Living people
Castleford Tigers players
English rugby league players
Great Britain under-21 national rugby league team players
Huddersfield Giants players
Place of birth missing (living people)
Rugby league props
Rugby league second-rows
Year of birth missing (living people)
York Wasps players